Handphone is 2009 South Korean thriller film.

Plot
Talent manager Seung-min sees Yoon Jin-ah, a rising actress, as his one last hope to turn his life around. Just as Jin-ah is on the path to stardom, he receives a threat from her former lover and gets her sex clip on his phone. Seung-min tracks down the culprit and retrieves the tape but ends up losing his phone. He realizes there is one last evidence of the sex tape on his phone and anxiously looks for it. Yi-gyu, who found Seung-min's phone, calls Seung-min's wife and asks her to come pick it up. On the night the phone was supposed to be returned, Yi-gyu doesn't show up. Now Yi-gyu is the one holding the leverage. Seung-min tries to do everything possible to get back his phone but Yi-gyu's demands are escalating to the point of no return.

Cast

Uhm Tae-woong as Oh Seung-min 
Park Yong-woo as Jung Yi-gyu
Park Sol-mi as Kim Jeong-yeon
Lee Se-na as Yoon Jin-ah
Kim Nam-gil as Jang Yoon-ho (Jin-ah's ex-boyfriend)
Hwang Bo-yeon as Kim Dae-jin (Seung-min's assistant) 
 as Choi (loan shark) 
 as Choi's bodyguard 
Kim Yu-seok as Han Joon-soo (attorney) 
Joo Jin-mo as Captain Kim 
Seo Woo as Yi-gyu's sister 
 as wedding toastmaster 
Kim Gu-ra as radio DJ who interviews Jin-ah
Jeon Bae-soo as sound engineer at radio station 
Bong Man-dae as movie director 
 as man who lost dog in the store 
 as mart female employee 2 
Jun In-kul as employee of management company
Kwak Byung-kyu as lead detective
Tae In-ho

Unofficial remakes
Two South Indian films have been made whose plots have close resemblance to Handphone, but they are not officially credited as remakes. The films are Chaappa Kurishu  (lit. "Heads or Tails"; Malayalam; 2011) and its remake Pulivaal ("Tail of Tiger"; Tamil; 2014)

References

External links
 
 
 

2009 films
2000s Korean-language films
2000s crime thriller films
South Korean crime thriller films
South Korean films remade in other languages
2000s South Korean films